The 13th Annual Japan Record Awards took place at the Imperial Garden Theater in Chiyoda, Tokyo, on December 31, 1971, starting at 7:00PM JST. The primary ceremonies were televised in Japan on TBS.

Award winners 
Japan Record Award
Kiyohiko Ozaki for "Mata Au Hi Made"
 Lyricist: Yū Aku
 Composer: Kyōhei Tsutsumi
 Arranger: Kyōhei Tsutsumi
 Record Company: Philips Records/Nippon Phonogram

Best Vocalist
Shinichi Mori for "Ofukurosan"
 Awarded again after 2 years, 2nd best vocalist award.
Best New Artist
Rumiko Koyanagi for "Watashi No Jyoukamachi"

Vocalist Award
 Yuuko Nagisa for "Saihate Bojou"
 Hiroshi Itsuki for "Yokohama Tasogare"
 Tokiko Kato for "Shiretoko Ryojou"
Awarded after 2 years, 2nd vocalist award.
New Artist Award
 Saori Minami for "17-sai"
 Simmons for "Koibito Mo Inainoni"
 Ouyang Fei Fei for "Ame No Midousuji"
 Naoki Hongou for "Moeru Koibito"

General Public Award
 Masaaki Sakai for "Saraba Koibito"
 Kōji Tsuruta for "Kizudarake No Jinsei"
Composer Award
 Kyōhei Tsutsumi for "Manatsu No Dekigoto" and "Ame Ga Yandara"
 Singer: Miki Hirayama and Yukiji Asaoka
 Awarded again after 2 years, 2nd composer award
Arranger Award
 Katsuhisa Hattori for "Hana No Märchen"
 Singer: Dark Ducks

Lyricist Award
 Osamu Kitayama for "Children Who Don't Know War" and Bouken
 Singer: Jiros and Yumi Makiba

Special Award
 Noriko Awaya
Song: Wakare No Blues

Planning Award
 JVC and Shoichi Ozawa for "Document-Nihon No Horo Gei"
 Awarded again after 3 years, Ozawa's 3rd planning award.
Children's Song Award
 Hibari Junior Chorus for "Jinjin"

External links
Official Website

Japan Record Awards
Japan Record Awards
Japan Record Awards
Japan Record Awards
1971